Hassan Harandi is an Iranian retired fighter pilot of Grumman F-14 Tomcat who served during the Iran–Iraq War.

French military historian Pierre Razoux has credited him with 6 aerial victories, a record that qualifies him as a flying ace.

See also 

 List of Iranian flying aces

References 

Iran–Iraq War flying aces
Iranian flying aces
Living people
Islamic Republic of Iran Army colonels
Year of birth missing (living people)
Islamic Republic of Iran Air Force personnel
Iranian military personnel of the Iran–Iraq War